The United Nations World Summit for Children was held in the United Nations Headquarters in New York City on 29–30 September 1990. The summit had the then-largest-ever gathering of heads of state and government to commit to a set of goals to improve the well-being of children worldwide by the year 2000. It was the first time a UN conference had set a broad agenda for a wide range of goals in health, education, nutrition and human rights. 

The main result of the World Summit was the joint signing of a World Declaration on the Survival, Protection and Development of Children and a Plan of Action comprising a detailed set of child-related human development goals for the year 2000. The World Summit set the stage for a decade of high level commitment on issues concerning children around the world and it set the stage for a series of UN conferences throughout the 1990s on population, environment, food, human rights, social development and women's rights.

Origin of project 
The Summit was proposed in 1989 by Prime Minister Brian Mulroney of Canada, President Hosni Mubarak of Egypt, President Moussa Traoré of Mali, President Carlos Salinas de Gortari of Mexico, Prime Minister Benazir Bhutto of Pakistan, and Prime Minister Ingvar Carlsson of Sweden. These six leaders worked together "to bring attention and promote commitment, at the highest political level, to goals and strategies for ensuring the survival, protection and development of children as key elements in the socio-economic development of all countries and human society". The United Nations Secretary General Javier Perez de Cuellar adopted the project and gave the Summit the support of the UNICEF and other UN organizations. A total 159 governments were invited to the event. In attendance were heads of state from 72 different countries, as well as representatives from 87 other nations. 

The Summit agenda was highly endorsed by three main organizations- the World Health Assembly, Education for All (led by UNESCO) and the United Nations Children's Fund (UNICEF) Executive Board. UNICEF was the main contributor. Every year following the Summit, it conducted progress reports on the implementation of Summit goals and released them through its many publications.

The World Summit for Children was held at a moment when the world was just beginning to demonstrate united interest in children's survival and development. A year prior the Convention on the Rights of the Child was adopted. It is a human rights treaty focused directly on the rights of children. The document had entered into force just a couple of weeks before the Summit was held.

Goals established 
There were 27 total goals established. The main objective was to improve child health and survival. The goals can be divided into six categories: health, survival, women's health, nutrition, education and protection. These goals were put into action from 1990-2000. After the ten-year period, world leaders would meet again to review the progress made during the decade.

Health 
There were nine health goals established. 
 Polio: global eradication by 2000 
 Neonatal tetanus: elimination by 1995 
 Deaths due to diarrhoea: 50 percent reduction 
 Vitamin A deficiency: virtual elimination by the year 2000 
 Iodine deficiency disorders (IDD): virtual elimination
 Elimination of guinea-worm disease (Dracunculiasis) by 2000
 Measles: reduction by 95 percent in measles deaths and 90 percent of measles cases by 1995
 Anemia: reduction of iron deficiency Anemia in women by one-third 
 Routine immunization: maintenance of a high level of immunization coverage

Survival 

 Infant and under-5 mortality (U5MR): reduction by one third in infant mortality and U5MR 
 Household food security: dissemination of knowledge and supporting services to increase food production 
 Acute respiratory infections (Influenza-like illness): reduction of ARI deaths by one third in children under five

Women's health 
 Childbirth care: access by all pregnant women to prenatal care
 Breastfeeding: empowerment of all women to breastfeed their children exclusively for four to six months and to continue breastfeeding, with complementary food, well into the second year of life
 Childbirth care: access by all pregnant women to referral facilities for high-risk pregnancies and obstetric emergencies
 Special attention to the health and nutrition of the female child and to pregnant and lactating women
 Maternal mortality: reduction of the rate by half
 Low birth-weight: reduction of the rate of low birth-weight to less than 10 percent

Nutrition 
 Malnutrition: reduction of severe and moderate malnutrition among under-five children by half
 Water: universal access to safe drinking water

Education 
 Family planning: access by all couples to information and services to prevent pregnancies that are too early, too closely spaced, too late, or too numerous 
 Knowledge skills and values required for better living: increased acquisition by individuals and families of knowledge, skills and values for better living
 Universal access to basic education: achievement of primary education by at least 80% of primary school-age children 
 Universal access to education with an emphasis on primary education for girls and literacy training for women
 Early childhood development (ECD): expansion of ECD activities, including appropriate low-cost family and community-based interventions

Protection 
 Improve protection of children in extremely difficult circumstances 
 Growth monitoring: growth promotion and regular growth monitoring among children to be institutionalized in all countries by the end of the 1990s

Laws established 
The high point of the Summit was the joint signing of the World Declaration on the Survival, Protection, and Development of Children and a Plan of Action on September 30, 1990. The World Declaration on the Survival, Protection, and Development of Children served as a written commitment to children worldwide. It summarizes the reason for the Summit and the goals established. The Plan of Action is a supplement to the World Declaration. It outlines how goals are to be met.

World declaration 
The World Declaration of the Survival, Protection, and Development of Children is subdivided into five categories: The Challenge, The Opportunity, The Task, The Commitment, and The Next Step. 
 The Challenge: To help countless children around the world who are exposed to dangers that hamper their growth and development. In particular those that are victims of poverty, malnutrition, war, and disease.
 The Opportunity: Declares that the fulfillment of the Summit goals will be an international co-operation, and leaders worldwide must implement the obligations agreed upon to on the Convention on the Rights of the Child. The Convention on the Rights of the Child was signed in 1989; it was the first international treaty to guarantee civil and political rights as well as economic, social, and cultural rights. The United States and South Sudan are the only countries who have not ratified the Convention. 
 The Task and The Commitment: Both of these serve to further explain the specific goals of the Summit.
 Improve Children's Health
 Improve Prenatal Health
 To strengthen the role and status of women 
 To provide educational opportunities
 To ameliorate the lives of homeless, refugee, disabled, and abused children 
 To protect children from the dangers of war
 To work for a global attack on poverty
 The Next Step: The adoption of The Plan of Action to specify how the World Declaration on the Survival, Protection, and Development of Children will be realized.

Plan of action 
The Plan of Action is a framework for more specific national and international undertakings. It addresses every goal individually to ensure the implementation of the Declaration of the World Summit for Children. It also concentrates on the follow-up and monitoring of the progression towards accomplishing each goal. The primary responsibility for the implementation of all goals was given to National Governments. Each country agreed to develop strategies through National Programs of Action to make sure these 27 global goals could become national realities. A total of 155 countries developed National Programs of Action.

Special session 

The Special Session on Children was a meeting the UN General Assembly held May 8–10, 2002. It was held to review the progress made for children in the decade since the 1990 World Summit for Children. It also served as a method to renew the commitments made in 1990, and to make a pledge for specific actions for the coming decade. In total about 70 Heads of State and/or Government attended the Session. Children from all around the world where invited to attend. They participated in numerous supporting events. One of the more important events was the Celebration of Leadership for Children held on May 9. The event encompassed a sense of unity and created a festive nature for the Session, but the real reason for the gathering was not forgotten.

The World Summit stands out from any other United Nations gathering because of its soundly set goals and its systematic follow up procedure. The Secretary-General’s report on children, titled "We the Children" uses data taken from 135 countries and is based on reviews conducted at the national level. It was the most comprehensive study of what was happening to the world’s children at that time. "We the Children" is a statistical representation of the minimal progress made in the decade. The report states, “The world has fallen short of achieving most of the goals of the World Summit for Children". Few of the goals established could be labeled as successes, others showed progress, but the majority were not met.

Success
 Polio: global eradication by 2000 
 Neonatal tetanus: elimination by 1995 
 Deaths due to diarrhea: 50 percent reduction
 Vitamin A deficiency: virtual elimination by the year 2000
 Iodine deficiency disorders (IDD): virtual elimination
 Elimination of guinea-worm disease(Dracunculiasis) by 2000

Some progress
 Infant and under-5 mortality: reduction by one third in infant mortality and Under-5 mortality
 Measles: reduction by 95 percent in measles deaths and 90 percent of measles cases by 1995 as a major step to global eradication
 Malnutrition: reduction of severe and moderate malnutrition among under-five children by half
 Breastfeeding: empowerment of all women to breastfeed their children exclusively for four to six months and to continue breastfeeding, with complementary food, well into the second year of life
 Low birth-weight: reduction of the rate of low birth-weight to less than 10%
 Family planning: access by all couples to information and services to prevent pregnancies that are too early, too closely spaced, too late or too numerous
 Childbirth care: access by all pregnant women to prenatal care
 Water: universal access to safe drinking water
 Universal access to basic education: achievement of primary education by at least 80% of primary school-age children
 Universal access to education with an emphasis on primary education for girls and literacy training for women
 Early childhood development (ECD): expansion of ECD activities, including appropriate low-cost family and community-based interventions 
 Improve protection of children in extremely difficult circumstances

No progress
 Routine immunization: maintenance of a high level of immunization coverage
 Maternal mortality: reduction of the rate by half
 Anemia: reduction of iron deficiency Anemia in women by one-third

Limited data
 There was limited or inconclusive data on the remaining 6 goals

"We the Children" places the blame to meet goals on financial barriers. Critics note that in many United Nations conferences, goals are ever set but never met, and that commitments on paper are rarely translated into actions. The Canadian Medical Association Journal attributes the lack of progress to the fact that documents emerging from UN conferences are policy documents rather than legal instruments or binding treaties, but it also remarks that the Special Session on Children will set the direction for international policy with respect to children for the next decade.

See also

 Child survival revolution

References
  Jennifer Kitts and Katherine McDonald (2002). "United Nations Special Session on Children: children's rights under attack," "Canadian Medical Association"
  United Nations Non-Governmental Liaison Service (May 2002)."General Assembly Special Session on Children," "NGLS Roundup"
  UNITED NATIONS Media Accreditation and Liaison Unit (2002)."Introduction of the SG’s Report, ‘We The Children’ By Carol Bellamy, Executive Director of UNICEF," "Press Release"
  UNITED NATIONS Media Accreditation and Liaison Unit (2002)." Agenda and Activities," "Special Session on Children"
  UNITED NATIONS Media Accreditation and Liaison Unit (2002). "The World's Goals for Children," "United Nations Special Session on Children"
  Department of Public Information (1997). "World Summit for Children (1990)," "Children's Summits"
  UNICEF "A Promise to Children," "Information Publications"
  UNICEF (2002) "Progress since the World Summit for Children(Statistical Review),"
 Bartell, Ernest J. O'Donnell, Alejandro. . University of Notre Dame Press, 2001, pg. 1-378
 India. Dept. of Women and Child Development. . 	[New Delhi] : Dept. of Women & Child Development, Ministry of Human Resource Development, Govt. of India, 1991. pg (5-11) (24-26)
 Anne R. Pebley. . RAND Corporation, 1993. pg 1-5

External links
 UNICEF Home Page
 Official UNICEF World Summit for Children Website
 Official UNICEF Special Session on Children Website

1990 conferences
Childhood